Arneta Honey Hireme-Smiler  (born 3 May 1981) is a New Zealand rugby football player who has represented her country in rugby league, rugby sevens and rugby union. Due to her multi-sport career, Hireme-Smiler has been referred to as Honey Bill Williams, in reference to her New Zealand male counterpart Sonny Bill Williams.

Playing career
From Putaruru, South Waikato, Hireme-Smiler played rugby league for Putaruru  Dragons from 5 years old and then onto the senior women's grades playing for the Papakura Sea Eagles club in the Auckland Rugby League women's competition. She has represented Counties Manukau, Bay of plenty, Waikato and Waicoa Bay in the New Zealand Rugby League's women's competition over her 20 year career at representative level.

In rugby union, she plays and coaches melville women's Premier rugby team and represents Waikato in the women's provincial championship.

Hireme-Smiler has played in four Rugby League world cups, she played for the Kiwiferns in the 2003 Women's world cup 2008 and 2013 World Cups. She captained the team in 2013. She was named in the world women's rugby league in all 4 world cup tournaments, and also awarded player of the Tournament in 2013.  Honey played in the 2017 Rugby League world cup representing the kiwiferns finishing the tournament as the highest try scorer and finalist for player of the tournament.

Hireme-Smiler has played for the New Zealand women's national rugby sevens team in the 2013 Rugby Sevens World Cup in Moscow. She has also played for New Zealand on the IRB Women's Sevens World Series and represented New Zealand Maori in sevens.

She made her New Zealand rugby union debut at the 2014 Women's Rugby World Cup, where she was named to the World Cup Dream Team and the World XV team. In 2014, she also became one of New Zealand's first contracted sevens players.

She competed in the Women's Rugby Super Series 2013-2016.

In June 2018, Hireme-Smiler joined the St George Illawarra Dragons women's team ahead of the inaugural NRL Women's Premiership commencing in September 2018.
Honey is the current Captain for the NZ women's rugby league team, co-captaining with Laura Mariu, between the pair they have over 36 years of experience at international level. Honey was awarded NZ women's rugby league player of the year in 2018 her third time winning top honours. Honey was also a finalist in 2018 for the International Women's Golden boot award

Honours and awards
She was named the New Zealand Rugby League's women's player of the year in 2007, 2012 and 2017.
Gallagher Waikato sportswomen of the year 2013, 2014
Player of the Tournament Women's Rugby league world cup 2013
Waikato Sports women of the year 2014,2015
Waikato women's Rugby player of the year 2013,2014,2015,2016
Top try scorer and player of the tournament finalist for the 2017 Rugby league world cup

In the 2020 New Year Honours, Hireme was appointed a Member of the New Zealand Order of Merit, for services to rugby league.

References

External links
 

1981 births
Living people
Counties Manukau rugby league team players
Members of the New Zealand Order of Merit
New Zealand female rugby league players
New Zealand female rugby sevens players
New Zealand female rugby union players
New Zealand women's international rugby sevens players
New Zealand women's international rugby union players
New Zealand Māori rugby league players
New Zealand Māori rugby union players
New Zealand women's national rugby league team captains
New Zealand women's national rugby league team players
New Zealand Warriors (NRLW) players
Papakura Sea Eagles players
Rugby union wings
St. George Illawarra Dragons (NRLW) players
Waikato rugby union players
Rugby union players from Waikato
People from Putāruru